The AGF Open was a European Tour golf tournament which was played in France from 1988 to 1990. The first event was held at Biarritz Golf Club and the other two at Golf de La Grande-Motte, near Montpellier. Its renewal in 1991 was cancelled due to sponsors being in dispute with the events promoters.

The most notable of the three winners was future European Ryder Cup captain Mark James of England. In 1990 the prize fund was £201,358, which was one of the smaller purses on the European Tour that year.

In 1988, David Llewellyn set a new European Tour record 72-hole aggregate of 258, surpassing the 259 set by Mark McNulty at the German Open in 1987. The record was equalled in 1990 by Ian Woosnam at the Monte Carlo Open and stood until August 2020, when it was broken by Andy Sullivan at Hanbury Manor Golf Club in the English Championship.

Winners

References

External links
Coverage on the European Tour's official site

Former European Tour events
Defunct golf tournaments in France
Recurring sporting events established in 1988
Recurring sporting events disestablished in 1990
1988 establishments in France
1990 disestablishments in France